Ansar al-Sharia was a joint operations room of Sunni Islamist and Salafist rebel factions that operate in Aleppo, Syria. Its stated aim is seizing the city of Aleppo from the Syrian government in order to administer the city under Sharia law on the basis of a joint charter.

In an October 2015 publication, the Washington D.C.-based Institute for the Study of War considered Ansar al-Sharia as one of the "powerbrokers" in Aleppo Governorate, being primarily "anti-regime" but not necessarily "anti-ISIS".

Participants 
, the following groups participate in the operations room:
 Al-Nusra Front
 Mujahideen of Islam Movement
 Supporters of the Caliphate Brigade
 Ahrar ash-Sham
 1st Regiment
 Ansar al-Din Front
 Dawn of the Caliphate Brigades
 Sultan Murad Brigade
 Saraya al-Mee’ad
 Companions Battalion
 Soldiers of God Battalion

See also
 Fatah Halab
 List of armed groups in the Syrian Civil War

References

Sources

External links
 Ansar al-Sharia's YouTube Channel

Anti-government factions of the Syrian civil war
Operations rooms of the Syrian civil war
Aleppo Governorate in the Syrian civil war
Jihadist groups in Syria
Salafi Islamist groups